Estadio Municipal de Comodoro Rivadavia is a multi-use stadium in Comodoro Rivadavia, Argentina. It is primarily used for football and is currently the home ground for Comisión de Actividades Infantiles Comodoro Rivadavia (C.A.I.). The stadium holds 10,000 people and was built in 1975.

Sports venues in Argentina
Comisión de Actividades Infantiles
Municipal de Comodoro Rivadavia